"The Electric Spanking of War Babies" is the title track from the last album recorded by the American funk band Funkadelic. The song was released as a single in 1981 by Warner Bros. Records. Instrumentally the track was constructed by co-writer Walter Morrison. It charted on the Billboard R&B chart, peaking at number 60.

Personnel

Bass, Guitar, Drums and Keyboards: Walter Morrison
Lead Guitar: Michael Hampton

Funkadelic songs
1981 singles
Songs written by George Clinton (funk musician)
Songs written by Walter Morrison
1981 songs
Warner Records singles